The Potts Inn is a historic former stagecoach inn at Main and Center Streets in Pottsville, Arkansas that is now a museum.  It is a two-story wood-frame structure, with a side gable roof and weatherboard siding.  A two-story gabled portico projects at the center of the front, supported by square posts.  Entrances on both levels have overhead transom windows.  The inn was built in 1858 by Kirkbride Potts, a Pennsylvania native, and is one of the finest antebellum houses in the region. 

The building was listed on the National Register of Historic Places in 1970.

See also
Fitzgerald Station and Farmstead: stagecoach stop in Springdale, Arkansas
National Register of Historic Places listings in Pope County, Arkansas

References

External links
 Potts Inn Museum

Arkansas Heritage Trails System
History museums in Arkansas
Museums in Pope County, Arkansas
National Register of Historic Places in Pope County, Arkansas
1858 establishments in Arkansas
Stagecoach stations on the National Register of Historic Places
Transportation buildings and structures on the National Register of Historic Places in Arkansas
Transportation in Pope County, Arkansas
Butterfield Overland Mail in Arkansas